K36DB-CD, virtual and UHF digital channel 36, is a low-powered, Class A television station licensed to Avon, Colorado, United States. Founded on September 17, 1992, the station is owned by Resort Television. The station's signal can be seen throughout the Avon and Vail area on cable channel 17.

See also
K34QB-D

External links
TV-8 & 17 official site

36DB-CD
Television channels and stations established in 1992
1992 establishments in Colorado
Low-power television stations in the United States